Alexandre Florian Joseph, Count Colonna-Walewski (4 May 181027 September 1868), was a Polish and French politician and diplomat, best known for his position as Foreign Minister of France under Napoleon III and for his diplomatic efforts presiding the Congress of Paris that created peace in the Crimean War and laid the base for modern international law of the sea with the Paris Declaration Respecting Maritime Law.

Early years 

Walewski was born at Walewice, near Warsaw in Poland from Countess Marie Walewska and her husband Athanasius, Count Walewski. He was rumoured to be the unacknowledged son of Napoleon I, although Athanasius legally acknowledged him as his own son. In 2013, published scholarship comparing DNA haplotype evidence taken from Emperor Napoleon, from his brother King Jérôme Bonaparte's descendant Charles, Prince Napoléon and from Colonna-Walewski's descendant indicated Alexandre's membership in the genetic male-line of the imperial House of Bonaparte.

Aged fourteen, Walewski refused to join the Imperial Russian army and fled to London, thence to Paris where the French government refused Tsar Alexander I's demands for his extradition to Russia.

Upon the accession of Louis-Philippe d'Orléans to the French throne in 1830, Walewski was dispatched to Poland, later the same year being entrusted by the leaders of the Polish November Uprising of 1830 as a diplomatic envoy to the Court of St James's. After the Fall of Warsaw, he took out letters of French naturalization and joined the French army, being in action in Algeria as a captain in the Chasseurs d'Afrique of the French Foreign Legion. In 1837 he resigned his commission to begin writing plays and working as a journalist for the press. He is said to have collaborated with the elder Dumas on Mademoiselle de Belle-Isle and a comedy of his, L'Ecole du monde, was produced at the Theâtre Français in 1840.

Diplomatic career 

Later that year the prime minister of France Thiers, also a man of letters, became patron to one of Walewski's papers, Le Messager des Chambres, before sending him on a mission to Egypt. Under Guizot's government Walewski was posted to Buenos Aires to liaise with the British ambassador, John Cradock, 1st Baron Howden.  Prince Louis Napoleon's accession to power in France as Napoleon III furthered his career with postings as envoy extraordinary to Florence and the Kingdom of Naples before London (1851–55), where he was charged with announcing the coup d'état to the prime minister, Lord Palmerston.In 1855, Walewski succeeded Drouyn de Lhuys as Minister of Foreign Affairs and he acted as President of, and French plenipotentiary at the Congress of Paris the following year, leading to peace in the Crimean War and to the Paris Declaration Respecting Maritime Law. The latter treaty did contain an important novelty in international law, creating the possibility for nations that were not involved in the establishment of the agreement, to become a party by acceding the Declaration afterwards.
  
As foreign minister, Walewski advocated a de-escalating strategy towards Russia, known as entente, opposing his emperor's strategy in Italy which led to war with Austria in 1859. After leaving the Foreign Ministry in 1860 he became France's Minister of State, an office which he held until 1863. He served as senator from 1855 to 1865, before being appointed to the Corps Législatif in 1865 and as president of the Chamber of Deputies by the Emperor, who returned him to the Senate after a revolt against his authority two years later.

Walewski was made a duke in 1866, was elected a member of the Académie des beaux-arts, appointed Grand Cross of the Légion d'honneur and made a Knight of Malta, also receiving the Gold Cross of Virtuti Militari.

Alexandre Walewski died of a stroke at Strasbourg on 27 September 1868 and is buried at Père Lachaise Cemetery in Paris.

Descendants 

He married on 1 December 1831 Lady Catherine Montagu (1808–1833), daughter of George, 6th Earl of Sandwich by his wife Lady Louisa Lowry-Corry. Following her death, he married secondly, on 4 June 1846 in Florence, Maria Anna, daughter of the Papal Count Zanobi di Ricci by his wife Princess Isabella Poniatowski. He also fathered a son by the actress Rachel Felix in 1844.

He had seven children, two from his first marriage, four from his second marriage, and one with a woman he wasn't married to.
By Lady Catherine Montagu (both died young):
Louise-Marie Colonna-Walewska.
Comte Georges-Edouard-Auguste Colonna-Walewski.
By Maria Anna di Ricci (1823–1912):
Isabel Colonna-Walewski (born Buenos Aires in 1847; she died an infant and is buried in La Recoleta Cemetery).
Comte Charles Walewski (1848–1916), married Félice Douay (died 1952); no children.
Elise Colonna-Walewski (died 1927) married Félix, Comte de Bourqueney; leaving issue.
Eugénie Colonna-Walewski (died 1884), married Comte Frédéric Mathéus; leaving issue.
By Rachel Felix:
Alexandre-Antoine Colonna-Walewski, (recognized 1844 and adopted by Walewski in 1860); has numerous surviving descendants.

Ancestry

Honours 

 : Knight of the Golden Cross of the Order of Virtuti Militari (3 March 1831)
 :  Knight of the Cross of Honor and Devotion of the Knights of Malta
 :  Grand Ribbon of the Imperial Order of the Legion of Honor
 : Grand Officer of the Imperial Order of the Legion of Honor
 :  Commander of the National Order of the Legion of Honor
 :  Great Ribbon of the Order of the Danebrog
 : Grand Ribbon of the Order of Saint Januarius
 : Grand Ribbon of the Order of Saints Maurice and Lazarus
 : Grand Ribbon of the Order of St. Joseph
 : Grand Ribbon of the Order of Vila Viçosa
 : Grand Ribbon of the Order of the Medjids
 : Great Ribbon of the Order of the Savior
 : Grand Ribbon of the Order of St. Hubert
 : Grand Ribbon of the Order of St. Stefan
 : Great Ribbon of the Order of the Seraphim
 : Grand Ribbon of the Order of the Netherlands Lion
 : Great Ribbon of the Order of Fidelity
 : Grand Ribbon of the Order of Leopold
 : Great Ribbon of the Order of the Black Eagle
 : Grand Ribbon of the Order of St. Anna

Works 
Un mot sur la question d'Afrique, Paris 1837
L'Alliance Anglaise, Paris 1838
L'École du Monde, ou la Coquette sans le savoir (comedy), Paris 1840

References

Simon Konarski, Armorial de la noblesse polonaise titrée, Paris 1958
Nouvelle Biographie Générale, Tome 46, Paris 1866

External links

 Walewski.org, Walewski family foundation
 NapoleonSeries.org, Genealogy entry
 PictureHistory.com, Photograph
 Spencer Napoleonica Collection at Newberry Library

1810 births
1868 deaths
People from Łowicz County
Counts of Poland
Counts Colonna-Walewski
Princes Colonna-Walewski
19th-century French diplomats
French Foreign Ministers
Burials at Père Lachaise Cemetery
Ambassadors of France to the United Kingdom
November Uprising participants
Polish emigrants to France
Officers of the French Foreign Legion
Illegitimate children of Napoleon
Grand Croix of the Légion d'honneur
Recipients of the Gold Cross of the Virtuti Militari
Knights of Malta
Alexandre
State ministers of France